"Issues" is a single by Escape the Fate off of their 2010 self-titled album. It was released on September 14, 2010. This song debuted at No. 48 on America's Music Charts for Active Rock, and peaked at No. 27 on the Billboard Hot Mainstream Rock Tracks chart, and debut No. 32 on both the Billboard Alternative Songs chart, and No. 39 on the Billboard Rock Songs chart.

Music video
The music video was released on September 28, 2010 and was directed by P.R. Brown. It presents a narrative that is told out of chronology. It features the band members playing in a Churchlike building. A mob of people break into the church and attack the band members, capturing them. Max is seen being tied to a wooden stake, where he is subsequently burned. Monte is tied up in a similar action, however his rope is pulled as he falls into a lake. Robert is forced to lean his head against a stump, while a man with an axe is implied to have chopped his head off. Meanwhile, Craig is tied to a noose, and is seen barely keeping himself up by lifting his body up by pushing on a stick with his foot. When the video ends, the stick cracks and breaks.

Track listing

Personnel
Craig Mabbitt - lead vocals
Bryan Money - lead guitar, backing vocals
Max Green - bass guitar, backing vocals
Robert Ortiz - drums, percussion

Chart performance

References

2010 singles
Escape the Fate songs
2010 songs
Interscope Records singles